The 110th Brigade was a formation of  the British Army during the First World War. It was raised as part of the new army also known as Kitchener's Army and assigned to the 37th Division. The brigade was also known as the Leicester Tigers Brigade was transferred to the 21st Division in July 1916.

Formation
This brigade was exchanged with the 21st Division's, 63rd Brigade on 8 July 1916
6th Battalion, Leicestershire Regiment 	 
7th Battalion, Leicestershire Regiment 	 
8th Battalion, Leicestershire Regiment 	 
9th Battalion, Leicestershire Regiment 	 
110th Machine Gun Company (joined 4 March 1916, moved to 37th Battalion M.G.C. February 1918)
110th Trench Mortar Battery (formed on 13 June 1916)

References

Infantry brigades of the British Army in World War I